Van Cicero Swearingen (February 2, 1873 – March 3, 1943) was an American attorney and politician who served as the 21st Florida Attorney General, serving from 1917 until 1921.

Early life and education 
Swearingen was born on February 2, 1873, in Nassau County, Florida. After being educated in local schools, Swearingen attended Mercer University in Macon, Georgia, graduating with his Bachelor of Laws degree in 1899. After graduating, he moved to Jacksonville, Florida, and began a private practice.

Political career

Mayor of Jacksonville 
In 1911, Governor Albert W. Gilchrist appointed Swearingen, a Democrat, to Jacksonville's municipal court. He served on the court until 1913, when he successfully ran for mayor of Jacksonville, defeating Socialist Thomas W. Cox with over 92% of the vote. 
As mayor, Swearingen began cracking down on vice, closing the bordellos and keeping minors out of pool halls. This struck a nerve with many in Jacksonville who saw value in the city's red light district. Swearingen even used spies in the form of undercover police officers to help find hidden bordellos. 

Swearingen sought reelection in 1915, though he faced three challengers in the Democratic primary: businessman Rudolph Grunthal, physician Charles Johnson, and former mayor J. E. T. Bowden. Though Swearingen came in first during the first round of the primary, he was defeated in the runoff by Bowden, receiving just 41.5% of the vote. Bowden would go on to win in the general election, defeating Socialist I. C. Baldwin.

Florida Attorney General 
In 1917, newly elected Governor Sidney Johnston Catts, a member of the Prohibition Party, appointed the incumbent Florida Attorney General, Thomas F. West, to the Florida Supreme Court. Seeing Swearingen's efforts in cracking down on Jacksonville's red light district, Catts appointed him to finish the remaining 3 years of West's term. 
Swearingen's tenure as Florida Attorney General remains controversial,  Swearingen oversaw the implementation of prohibition in Florida. Despite making use of his spy network from Jacksonville, Swearingen was unable to combat rum runners coming from Cuba and the Bahamas. 

Additionally, the Ocoee massacre occurred near the end of Swearingen's tenure. In response to African-Americans attempting to vote in November of 1920 in the town of Ocoee, Florida, the entire black community of North Ocoee was razed to the ground, with as many as 56 blacks lynched or burned in their own homes. Swearingen, a noted racist, did nothing in the aftermath of the massacre to bring the perpetrators to justice. 

In 1920, Swearingen did not run for reelection, instead deciding to run for Florida governor. Swearingen faced the Speaker of the Florida House of Representatives Cary A. Hardee and State Senator Lincoln Hulley in the Democratic primary. Swearingen was defeated by Hardee by over 22,000 votes. Hardee would go on to win in the general election. 

After this loss, Swearingen retired, moving to Miami, Florida, in 1925.

Personal life and death 
Swearingen married Alice Padgett on January 1, 1899. They had 6 children together. Additionally, Swearingen was a member of multiple fraternal orders, including the Freemasons, the Shriners from Jacksonville's Morocco Temple, the Independent Order of Odd Fellows, and the Knights of Pythias.

Swearingen died at his home in Miami on March 3, 1943.

Electoral history

References

Florida Attorneys General
Mayors of Jacksonville, Florida
1873 births
Date of death unknown
1943 deaths
People from Nassau County, Florida
People from Jacksonville, Florida
People from Miami
Florida Democrats
20th-century American politicians
American Freemasons
Prohibition in the United States
Mercer University alumni